The 1980 South Carolina Gamecocks football team represented the University of South Carolina as an independent during the 1980 NCAA Division I-A football season. Led by sixth-year head coach Jim Carlen, the Gamecocks compiled a record of 8–4. South Carolina was invited to the Gator Bowl, where they lost to Pittsburgh, 37–3. Gamecocks running back George Rogers won the Heisman Trophy.

Season
In 1980, the South Carolina Gamecocks returned with plenty of talent, which was headlined by senior running back and Heisman candidate George Rogers. His 1,781 yards was the best in the nation and earned him a spot as a finalist for the Heisman Trophy. The Downtown Athletic Club in New York City named Rogers as the winner of the 1980 Heisman Trophy.  Rogers beat out an impressive group of players, including Pittsburgh defensive lineman Hugh Green and Georgia running back Herschel Walker. Rogers also earned spots on eight All-America teams, all First Team honors.

Rogers had his number "38" retired during halftime ceremonies at South Carolina's final 1980 home game.  He was the first University of South Carolina player to have his jersey retired while still active at the school.

Rogers left the Gamecock football program as its most successful running back, and many of his records remain after all these years.  His 5,204 yards is still the highest career total by any Gamecock running back, and his 31 rushing touchdowns is tied with Harold Green for second place behind Marcus Lattimore.  He is second on the all-time points scored list with 202.  He also gained more than 100 yards in each of his final 22 college games.

Schedule

Roster

Team players in the NFL

Reference:

Awards and honors
George Rogers, Heisman Trophy

References

South Carolina
South Carolina Gamecocks football seasons
South Carolina Gamecocks football